Julio Escoto (born February 28, 1944 in San Pedro Sula) is a Honduran short-story teller, novelist and essayist. Notable novels include El Arbol de los Panuelos, Días de Ventisca, Noches de Huracán, El General Morazán marcha a batallar desde la Muerte, Rey del Albor. Madrugada, and the last published (2007) El Génesis en Santa Cariba.

External links
Literature

Honduran male writers
1944 births
Living people

International Writing Program alumni